Countess Leonore of Orange-Nassau, Jonkvrouwe van Amsberg (Leonore Marie Irene Enrica; born 3 June 2006), is the third child and second daughter of Prince Constantijn and Princess Laurentien of the Netherlands. She is a member of the Dutch royal family and currently seventh in the line of succession to the Dutch throne.

Life 
Countess Leonore was born on 3 June 2006 in HMC Bronovo in The Hague, She was baptised in the chapel of Het Loo Palace in Apeldoorn on 8 October 2006. Her godparents are her paternal aunt, Queen Máxima; her maternal uncle, Marius Brinkhorst; her father's first cousin, Juliana Guillermo; and Count Jean-Charles Ullens de Schooten Whettnall.

Titles and styles

By Royal Decree of 11 May 2001, nr. 227, it was determined that all children and male-line descendants of Prince Constantijn of the Netherlands would bear the title of Count (Countess) of Orange-Nassau and the honorific Jonkheer (Jonkvrouwe) van Amsberg, and have the surname Van Oranje-Nassau van Amsberg.

Upon the abdication of Queen Beatrix on 30 April 2013, the children of Prince Constantijn and Princess Laurentien ceased to be members of the Royal House, although continue to be members of the royal family.

References

2006 births
Living people
House of Orange-Nassau
Orange-Nassau, Leonore van
Countesses of Orange-Nassau
Jonkvrouws of Amsberg